David Kaff is a British musician. He was a member of Rare Bird in the 1970s, credited as David Kaffinetti. In 1984, he played the part of keyboardist Viv Savage in the film This Is Spinal Tap.

References

British keyboardists
Spinal Tap (band) members